Year 982 (CMLXXXII) was a common year starting on Sunday (link will display the full calendar) of the Julian calendar.

Events 
 By place 
 Europe 
 Summer – Emperor Otto II (the Red) assembles an imperial expeditionary force at Taranto, and proceeds along the gulf coast towards Calabria. In the meantime, Emir Abu'l-Qasim (Kalbid) of the Emirate of Sicily declares a Holy War (jihad) against the Germans, but his forces retreat when he notices the unexpected strength of Otto's troops (not far from Rossano).
 July 13 (or 14) – Battle of Stilo: Abu'l-Qasim is cornered by the imperial German forces led by Otto II at Cape Colonna (south of Crotone). After a violent clash, the German heavy cavalry destroys the Muslim centre, killing al-Qasim in the initial fighting. The Saracens hold together and draw Otto into a trap, encircling and defeating his forces (killing around 4,000 men).
 King Harald Bluetooth invades Norway, pillaging southwest Norway all the way to Stad, where he encounters Haakon Sigurdsson (the de facto ruler of Norway) and his army. He flees back to Denmark, ending the invasion.

 Asia 
 'Adud al-Dawla, emir (king of kings) of the Buyid Dynasty, concludes a 10-year peace treaty with the Byzantine Empire. He establishes what will soon become the most important hospital of Baghdad.
 The Indian Rashtrakuta Dynasty ends as its last ruler Indra IV commits Sallekhana (the Jain religious practice of voluntarily starving oneself to death).

 October 13 – Chinese Emperor Jingzong dies in camp during a hunting trip after a 13-year reign. He is succeeded by his 11-year-old son, Shengzong, as ruler of the Khitan-led Liao Dynasty. His mother, Empress Dowager Xiao Yanyan becomes the regent.

 By topic 
 Exploration 
 Erik the Red establishes the first Viking colonies in Greenland (see 981).

 Religion 
 Adalbert becomes bishop of Prague after the death of Dětmar (or Dietmar).

Births 
 Atiśa, Bengali Buddhist religious leader (d. 1054)
 Dirk III (or Theodoric), count of Holland (d. 1039)
 Judith of Brittany, duchess of Normandy (d. 1017)

Deaths 
 January 2 – Dětmar (or Dietmar), bishop of Prague
 July 13 (or 14) – Battle of Stilo:
 Abu'l-Qasim, Kalbid emir of Sicily
 Gunther, margrave of Merseburg
 Henry I, bishop of Augsburg
 Landulf IV, Lombard prince
 Pandulf II, Lombard prince 
 October 13 – Jing Zong, emperor of the Liao Dynasty (b. 948)
 November 26 – Matilda, queen of Burgundy (or 981)
 Abu'l Haret Muhammad, Farighunid ruler (approximate date)
 Abu'l-Husain Utbi, Samanid vizier
 Al-Hasan ibn Ubayd Allah ibn Tughj, Ikhshidid prince and regent
 Eadwine, ealdorman of Sussex (approximate date)
 Gao Huaide, Chinese general (b. 926)
 Indra IV, Rashtrakuta ruler (India)
 Jordan, bishop of Poland (or 984)
 Otto I, duke of Swabia and Bavaria (b. 954)
 Senorina, Galician abbess and saint
 Shabbethai Donnolo, Jewish physician (b. 913)
 Wang Pu, Chinese chancellor (b. 922)

References